The Franklin O-150 (company designation 4AC-150) was an American air-cooled aircraft engine of the late 1930s. The engine was of four-cylinder, horizontally-opposed layout and displaced . The power output was nominally .

Applications
Aeronca 50 Chief
Bartlett Zephyr
Clutton-Tabenor FRED
Fetterman Chickadee
Payne MC-7 pusher
Piper J-3 Cub
Rose Parakeet
Taylorcraft BF-65
Taylorcraft L-2

Engines on display
Aerospace Museum of California - Franklin 0-150 (4AC-150)

Specifications (4AC-150)

See also

References

Notes

Bibliography

 Gunston, Bill. (1986) World Encyclopedia of Aero Engines. Patrick Stephens: Wellingborough. p. 57

Franklin aircraft engines
1930s aircraft piston engines
Boxer engines